Hapoel Tirat Shalom is an Israeli football club based in the Tirat Shalom neighbourhood of Ness Ziona. The club is currently in Liga Gimel Central division.

History
The club was founded in 1973 and started at Liga Dalet, then the sixth and lowest tier of Israeli football, where they played until the league was scrapped (in 1985), and as a result were promoted to Liga Gimel.

In the 2003–04 season, Tirat Shalom won Liga Gimel Central division and were promoted to Liga Bet, the fifth tier at the time. Tirat Shalom played six seasons in Liga Bet South B division, up until 2009–10 (the season in which Liga Bet became the fourth tier of Israeli football, following the closure of Liga Artzit), when they finished bottom and relegated to Liga Gimel, where they play today, at the Central division.

Honours

League

References

External links
Hapoel Tirat Shalom  Israel Football Association 

Tirat Shalom
Tirat Shalom
Sport in Ness Ziona
Association football clubs established in 1973